This list of the Paleozoic life of Illinois contains the various prehistoric life-forms whose fossilized remains have been reported from within the US state of Illinois and are between 538.8 and 252.17 million years of age.

A

 †Acantherpestes
 †Acantherpestes inequalis – type locality for species
 †Acantherpestes major – type locality for species
 †Acanthoparypha
 †Acanthoparypha subcircularis
 †Acanthopecten
 †Acanthopecten carboniferus
 †Acanthotriletes
 †Acanthotriletes aculeolatus
 †Acanthotriletes dimorphus
 †Achatella
 †Achatella katharina
 †Acrocrinus
 †Acrocrinus constrictus
 †Actinoceras
 †Actinopteria
 †Actinopteria boydi
 †Adeloblatta
 †Adeloblatta columbiana – type locality for species
 †Adeloblatta sellardsi
 †Adeloneura – type locality for genus
 †Adeloneura thompsoni – type locality for species
 †Adiaphtharsia – type locality for genus
 †Adiaphtharsia ferrea – type locality for species
 †Adiphlebia – type locality for genus
 †Adiphlebia lacoana – type locality for species
 †Adolarryia – type locality for genus
 †Adolarryia bairdi – type locality for species
 †Aenigmatodes – type locality for genus
 †Aenigmatodes danielsi – type locality for species
 †Aetophlebia – type locality for genus
 †Aetophlebia singularis – type locality for species
 †Agogoblattina
 †Agogoblattina occidua – type locality for species
 †Ahrenisporites
 †Ahrenisporites guerickei
 †Ahrensisporites
 †Ahrensisporites guerickei
 †Alanympha – type locality for genus
 †Alanympha richardsoni – type locality for species
 †Alatisporites
 †Alatisporites hexalatus
 †Alatisporites punctatus
 †Alatisporites trialatus
  †Alethopteris
 †Alethopteris decurrens
 †Alethopteris lonchitica
 †Alethopteris owenii
 †Alethopteris serlii
 †Allagecrinus
 †Allagecrinus mccraneyensis – type locality for species
 †Alloiopteris
 †Alloiopteris gracillima
 †Alloiopteris quercifolia – or unidentified comparable form
 †Alloiopteris sternbergi
 †Allosocrinus
 †Allosocrinus bronaughi
 †Amarixys
 †Amarixys gracilis – type locality for species
 †Amarixys stellaris – type locality for species
 †Amarixys sulcata – type locality for species
 †Amaurotoma
 †Amaurotoma leavenworthana
 †Ambocoelia
 †Ambocoelia louisianaensis
 †Ambocoelia minuta
 †Ambonychia – tentative report
 †Ametretus – type locality for genus
 †Ametretus laevis – type locality for species
 †Ameura
 †Amousus – type locality for genus
 †Amousus mazonus – type locality for species
  †Amphibamus – type locality for genus
 †Amphibamus grandiceps – type locality for species
 †Amphicoelia
 †Amphilichas
 †Amphilichas subdisjunctus
 †Amphiscapha
 †Amphiscapha subrugosa
 †Amplexizaphrentis
 †Amplexizaphrentis spinulosus
  †Amynilyspes – type locality for genus
 †Amynilyspes wortheni – type locality for species
 †Anaphragma
 †Anaphragma mirabile
 †Anapiculatisporites
 †Anapiculatisporites grundensis
 †Anapiculatisporites spinosus
 †Anastrophia
 †Anegertus – type locality for genus
 †Anegertus cubitalis – type locality for species
 †Anematina
 †Anematina proutana
 †Anepitedius – type locality for genus
 †Anepitedius giraffa – type locality for species
   †Annularia
 †Annularia asteris – or unidentified comparable form
 †Annularia cuspidata
 †Annularia stellata
 †Annularia vernensis – or unidentified comparable form
 †Anobasicrinus
 †Anobasicrinus brevis – type locality for species
 †Anomphalus – type locality for genus
 †Anomphalus rotulus – type locality for species
 †Anthracoceras
 †Anthracoceras wanlessi – type locality for species
 †Anthracophausia
 †Anthracophausia ingelsorum
 †Anthracoscorpio – tentative report
 †Anthracospirifer
 †Anthracospirifer leidyi
 †Anthracothremma – type locality for genus
 †Anthracothremma robusta – type locality for species
 †Anthrakoris – type locality for genus
 †Anthrakoris aetherius – type locality for species
 †Antiquatonia
 †Antiquatonia portlockianus – or unidentified comparable form
 †Antirhynchonella
 †Antirhynchonella ventricosa – or unidentified comparable form
 †Aphantomartus
 †Aphantomartus pustulatus – type locality for species
 †Apiculatasporites
 †Apiculatasporites latigranifer
 †Apiculatasporites setulosus
 †Apiculatasporites spinososaetosus
 †Apiculatasporites variocorneus
 †Apiculatasporites variusetosus
 †Apiculatisporites
 †Apiculatisporites abditus
 †Apiculatisporites frequentisporites
 †Apiculatisporites lappites
 †Apiculatisporites setulosus
 †Apithanus – type locality for genus
 †Apithanus jocularis – type locality for species
 †Apographiocrinus
 †Apographiocrinus typicalis
 †Archaeocalamites
 †Archaeocalamites radiatus
 †Archaeocalyptocrinus
 †Archaeocalyptocrinus obconicus
   †Archaeocidaris – tentative report
 †Archaeologus – type locality for genus
 †Archaeologus falcatus – type locality for species
     †Archaeopteris
 †Archaeopteris stricta
  †Archimedes
 †Archimedes communis
 †Archimedes compactus
 †Archimedes invaginatus
 †Archimedes lativolvis
 †Archimedes macfarlani
 †Archimedes swallovanus
 †Archimedes terebriformis
 †Archimylacris
 †Archimylacris paucinervis – type locality for species
 †Archisymplectes – type locality for genus
 †Archisymplectes rhothon – type locality for species
 †Architarbus – type locality for genus
 †Architarbus minor – type locality for species
 †Architarbus rotundatus – type locality for species
 †Archiulus – tentative report
 †Archiulus glomeratus – type locality for species
 †Archoblattina – type locality for genus
 †Archoblattina beecheri – type locality for species
 †Archoblattina scudderi – type locality for species
  †Arctinurus
 †Arctinurus boltoni
 †Arctinurus chicagoensis
 †Argentiproductus
 †Argentiproductus auriculatus
  †Arthrolycosa – type locality for genus
 †Arthrolycosa antiqua – type locality for species
 †Arthrolycosa danielsi – type locality for species
 †Arthropitys
 †Arthropitys communis
 †Artisia
 †Artisia transversa
 †Asemoblatta
 †Asemoblatta danielsi – type locality for species
 †Asemoblatta mazona – type locality for species
 †Asinomphalus
 †Asinomphalus antiqua
 †Asolanus
 †Asolanus camptotaenia
 †Astartella
 †Astartella compacta
 †Astartella concentrica
 †Asterophyllites
 †Asterophyllites equisetiformis – or unidentified comparable form
 †Asterophyllites longifolius
 †Asterophyllites multifolia
 †Asterotheca
 †Asterotheca miltoni – or unidentified comparable form
 †Astraeospongium
 †Asyncritus – type locality for genus
 †Asyncritus reticulatus – type locality for species
 †Athyris
 †Athyris vittata
  †Atrypa
 †Atrypa putilla
 †Atrypa reticularis – report made of unidentified related form or using admittedly obsolete nomenclature
 †Aulacotheca
 †Aulertupus – type locality for genus
 †Aulertupus tembrocki – type locality for species
  †Aviculopecten
 †Aviculopecten fasciculatus
 † Avonia
 †Avonia pyidata
 †Axiodeaneia
 †Axiodeaneia glenparkensis
 †Axiologus – type locality for genus
 †Axiologus thoracicus – type locality for species

B

 †Balteosporites
 †Balteosporites minutus
 †Bandringa – type locality for genus
 †Bandringa herdinae – type locality for species
 †Bandringa rayi – type locality for species
 †Bassleroceras
 †Bassleroceras lasallense
 †Baylea
 †Baylea minuta – type locality for species
 †Baylea sinuatus – type locality for species
 †Baylea subconstricta – type locality for species
 †Beecheria
 †Beecheria illinoisense
 †Beecheria paraplicata
 †Belemnospongia
 †Belemnospongia parmula
  †Bellerophon
 †Bellerophon chesterensis – type locality for species
 †Bellerophon incomptus – type locality for species
 †Bellerophon spergensis
 †Bellerophon stevensianus
 †Bellerophon tenuilineata – type locality for species
 †Belinurus
 †Belinurus lacoei – type locality for species
 †Bembexia
 †Bembexia gradilispira – type locality for species
 †Beyrichiella
 †Beyrichiella confluens
 †Bicarina
 †Bicarina petilitornata
 †Bighornia
 †Bighornia patella – or unidentified comparable form
 †Bizarrea – type locality for genus
 †Bizarrea obscura – type locality for species
 †Blattoidea
 †Blattoidea anceps – type locality for species
 †Blattoidea carri – type locality for species
 †Blattoidea melanderi
 †Blattoidea schuchertiana – type locality for species
 †Blattoidea sellardsiana – type locality for species
 †Brabeocrinus – type locality for genus
 †Brabeocrinus christinae – type locality for species
 †Brachycycloceras
 †Brachycycloceras normale
   †Brachydectes
 †Brachydectes newberryi
 †Brachythyris
 †Brachythyris hortonensis
 †Brevilamnulella – tentative report
 †Brevilamnulella thebesensis
 †Bucania
 †Bucania batchtownensis – type locality for species
 †Bulimorpha
 †Bulimorpha minor
 †Bulimorpha whitfieldi – type locality for species
 †Bumastoides
 †Bumastoides billingsi
   †Bumastus
 †Bumastus armata
 †Bumastus armatus – or unidentified comparable form
 †Bumastus chicagoensis
 †Bumastus cuniculus – or unidentified comparable form
 †Bumastus graftonensis
 †Bumastus insignis
 †Bumastus springfieldensis
 †Bumastus transversalis
 †Buthiscorpius
 †Buthiscorpius lemayi – type locality for species

C

 †Cacurgus – type locality for genus
 †Cacurgus spilopterus – type locality for species
 †Cadiospora
 †Cadiospora fithiana
 †Cadiospora magna
  †Calamites
 †Calamites cistiiformis – or unidentified comparable form
 †Calamites rectangularis
 †Calamites suckowii
 †Calamocarpon
 †Calamocarpon insignis
 †Calamodendron
 †Calamodendron americanum
 †Calamospora
 †Calamospora breviradiata
 †Calamospora flava
 †Calamospora flexilis
 †Calamospora hartungiana
 †Calamospora liquida
 †Calamospora minuta
 †Calamospora mutabilis
 †Calamospora pedata
 †Calamospora straminea
 †Calamostachys
 †Calamostachys americana
 †Calamostachys andanensis
 †Calamostachys inversibractis – type locality for species
 †Calceocrinus
 †Calliasterella
 †Calliasterella americana
 †Calliocrinus
 †Calliocrinus cornatus
 †Calliocrinus cornutus
 †Calliocrinus pentangularis
  †Callipteridium
 †Calvinia
 †Calvinia edgewoodensis
 †Calymene
 †Calymene breviceps
  †Calymene celebra
 †Calyptaulax
 †Calyptaulax callicephala
 †Camarophorella
 †Camarophorella buckleyi – or unidentified comparable form
 †Camarotoechia
 †Camerella
 †Camptotriletes
 †Camptotriletes bucculentus
 †Camptotriletes triangularis
 †Cancrinella
 †Cancrinella boonensis
 †Cannophyllites
 †Cannophyllites abbreviata
 †Cannophyllites dawsoni
 †Cannophyllites fasciculata
 †Cannophyllites marginata
 †Cannophyllites rectinervis
 †Cannophyllites southwelli
 †Carbonocoryphe
 †Carbonocoryphe planucauda
 †Carbonympha – type locality for genus
 †Carbonympha herdinai – type locality for species
 †Cardiocarpon
 †Cardiopteridium
 †Cardiothyris
 †Cardiothyris pristina
 †Carpocrinus
 †Caryocrinites
 †Caryocrinites ornatus – or unidentified comparable form
  †Caseodus
 †Caseodus basalis – type locality for species
 †Catadyesthus
 †Catadyesthus priscus
 †Caulopteris
 †Cephalerpeton – type locality for genus
 †Cephalerpeton ventriarmatum – type locality for species
 †Ceratiocaris
 †Ceratiocaris markhami
 †Ceratocephala
 †Ceratocephala goniata
 †Ceraurinella
 †Ceraurinella tenuisculptus
 †Ceraurinus
 †Ceraurinus platycanthus
 †Cerauromerus
 †Cerauromerus hydei
  †Ceraurus
 †Ceraurus globulobatus
 †Ceraurus pleurexanthemus
 †Cervifurca
 †Cervifurca nasuta
 †Chaenomya
 †Chaetetes
  †Cheirurus
 †Cheirurus niagarensis – or unidentified comparable form
 †Cheirurus patens
 †Cheliphlebia – type locality for genus
 †Cheliphlebia carbonaria – type locality for species
 †Cheliphlebia mazona – type locality for species
 †Chenilleophycus
 †Chenilleophycus godfreyensis
 †Chicagocrinus
 †Chicagocrinus ornatus
 †Chirodus
 †Chirodus orbicularis
 †Chlidonocrinus
 †Chlidonocrinus erectus – type locality for species
 †Chlidophorus
 †Chonetes
 †Chonetes ornatus
 †Chonetinella
 †Chrestotella
 †Chrestotella danae – type locality for species
 †Chrestotes – type locality for genus
 †Chrestotes lapidea – type locality for species
 †Cirratriradites
 †Cirratriradites annulatus
 †Cirratriradites annuliformis
 †Cirratriradites tenuis
 †Clathrocrinus – type locality for genus
 †Clathrocrinus clathratus – type locality for species
 †Clathrocrinus clinatus – type locality for species
 †Clathrodictyon
 †Clathrodictyon vesiculosum
 †Clathrospira
 †Clathrospira subconica
  †Cleiothyridina
 †Cleiothyridina atrypoides
 †Cleiothyridina sublamellosa
 †Clepsydrops – type locality for genus
 †Clepsydrops collettii – type locality for species
 †Clepsydrops vinslovii – type locality for species
 †Cliftonia
 †Cliftonia tubulistriata
 †Clonocrinus
 †Clonocrinus chicagoensis
 †Clonocrinus niagarensis
   †Coelacanthus
 †Coelacanthus exiguus
 †Coelocystis
 †Coelocystis subglobosus
 †Columinisporites
 †Columinisporites ovalis
 †Complexisporites
 †Complexisporites chalonerii
  †Composita
 †Composita argentea
 †Composita matutina
 †Composita subtilita
 †Composita trinuclea
 †Compsaster
 †Compsaster formosus
 †Condrathyris
 †Condrathyris perplexa
 †Conocardium
 †Conocardium chesterensis – type locality for species
 †Contocrinus
 †Contocrinus coupi – type locality for species
 †Converrucosisporites
 †Converrucosisporites subverrucosus
 †Convolutispora
 †Convolutispora florida
 †Convolutispora fromensis
 †Cooperoceras
 †Cordaianthus
 †Cordaicarpus
 †Cordaicladus
  †Cordaites
 †Cordaites communis
 †Cordaites principalis
  †Cornulites
 †Corynepteris
 †Corynepteris erosa – or unidentified comparable form
  †Crania
 †Crania dodgei
 †Craniops
 †Crassiproetus
 †Crassiproetus occidens
 †Crassispora
 †Crassispora kosankei
 †Crassispora plicata
   †Cricotus – type locality for genus
 †Cricotus heteroclitus – type locality for species
 †Cristatisporites
 †Cristatisporites alpernii
 †Cristatisporites indignabundus
 †Crossotheca
  †Crotalocrinites
 †Crotalocrinites cora
 †Crotalocrinites vanhornei
 †Crurithyris
 †Crurithyris levicula – or unidentified comparable form
 †Crurithyris planoconvexa
 †Cryptothyrella
 †Cryptothyrella ovoides
  †Ctenacanthus
 †Ctenacanthus buttersi – type locality for species
 †Ctenodonta
 †Ctenodonta concinna
 †Curculioides
 †Curculioides gigas – type locality for species
 †Curculioides mcluckiei – type locality for species
 †Curculioides scaber – type locality for species
 †Curriella – tentative report
  †Cyathocrinites
 †Cyclites
 †Cyclites globosa – type locality for species
 †Cyclogranisporites
 †Cyclogranisporites aureus
 †Cyclogranisporites breviradiata
 †Cyclogranisporites breviradiatus
 †Cyclogranisporites leopoldi
 †Cyclogranisporites micaceus
 †Cyclogranisporites microgranus
 †Cyclogranisporites minutus
 †Cyclogranisporites obliquus
 †Cyclogranisporites orbicularis
 †Cyclogranisporites staplini
 †Cyclonema
 †Cyclonema daytonensis
 †Cyclonema intermedium
 †Cyclus
 †Cyclus americanus – type locality for species
 †Cymatospira
 †Cymatospira welleri
 †Cyperites
  †Cyphaspis
 †Cyphaspis globosus
 †Cyphaspis intermedia
 †Cyphocrinus
 †Cyphocrinus chicagoensis
 †Cypricardella
 †Cypricardella bellistriata
 †Cyrtia
  †Cyrtoceras
 Cytherella
 †Cytherella glandella
 †Cytherellina
 †Cytherodon – tentative report
 †Cytherodon appresus
 †Cytocrinus

D

 †Dabasacanthus – type locality for genus
 †Dabasacanthus inskasi – type locality for species

 †Dactylotheca
 †Dactylotheca aspera
 †Dalejina
 †Dalmanella
 †Dalmanella edgewoodensis
   †Dalmanites
 †Dalmanites danai
 †Dalmanites illinoisensis
 †Dalmanites obex
 †Dalmanites platycaudatus
 †Danielsiella – type locality for genus
 †Danielsiella priscula – type locality for species
 †Dasciocrinus
 †Dasciocrinus spinifer
 †Dasyleptus
 †Dawsonoceras
 †Decoroproetus
  †Deiphon
 †Deiphon americanus
 †Delicaster – type locality for genus
 †Delicaster enigmaticus
 †Delthyris
 †Deltoidospora
 †Deltoidospora levis
 †Deltoidospora priddyi
 †Deltoidospora sphaerotriangula
 †Denayella
 †Denayella rotalia – or unidentified comparable form
 †Densosporites
 †Densosporites annulatus
 †Densosporites lobatus – or unidentified comparable form
 †Densosporites ruhus
 †Densosporites sinuosus
 †Densosporites sphaerotriangularis
 †Densosporites triangularis
 †Derbyia
 †Derbyia crassa
 †Derbyoides
 †Derbyoides nebrascensis
 †Desmograptus
 †Desmograptus micronematodes
 †Desmopteris
 †Devonatrypa
 †Devononema – type locality for genus
 †Devononema typicum – type locality for species
 †Diagonodictya – type locality for genus
 †Diagonodictya crusta – type locality for species
 †Diamphidiocystis
 †Diamphidiocystis drepanon
 †Diaphorodendron
 †Diaphorodendron rimosum
 †Diaphragmus
 †Diaphragmus fasciculatus
 †Dicalamophyllum
 †Dicalamophyllum americanum
 †Dichocrinus
 †Dichocrinus nola – type locality for species
 †Dicksonites
 †Dicoelosia
 †Dicranopeltis
 †Dicranopeltis decipiens
 †Dictyoclostus
 †Dictyoclostus inflatus
 †Dictyomonolites
 †Dictyomonolites swadei
 †Dictyonema
 †Dictyonema crassibasale
 †Dictyonema retiforme
 †Dictyonema tenellum
 †Dictyophlois
 †Dictyophlois reticulata var. illinoisensis
 †Dictyotomaria
 †Dictyotomaria depressus – type locality for species
 †Dictyotomaria wortheni – type locality for species
 †Dictyotomaria yochelsoni
 †Dictyotriletes
 †Dictyotriletes bireticulatus
 †Dictyotriletes danvillensis
 †Dictyotriletes densoreticulatus
 †Dictyotriletes distortus
 †Dictyotriletes falsus – or unidentified comparable form
 †Dictyotriletes reticulocingulum – or unidentified comparable form
 †Dictyoxylon – or unidentified comparable form
 †Dieconeura – type locality for genus
 †Dieconeura arcuata – type locality for species
 †Dieconeura mazona – type locality for species
 †Dielasmella
 †Dielasmella compressa
 †Diexodus – type locality for genus
 †Diexodus debilis – type locality for species
 †Dimerocrinites
 †Dimerocrinites occidentalis
 †Dimerocrinites pentangularis
 †Dinobolus
  †Diplocaulus – type locality for genus
 †Diplocaulus salamandroides – type locality for species
 †Diplothmema
 †Diplothmema cheathami
 †Discotarbus – type locality for genus
 †Discotarbus deplanatus – type locality for species
 †Distortitisporites
 †Distortitisporites illinoiensis
 †Ditomopyge
 †Ditomopyge scitula
 †Dolichoharpes
 †Dolichoharpes uniserialis
 †Domatoceras
 †Domatoceras mattoonense – type locality for species
 †Domatoceras wortheni – type locality for species
 †Donaldina
 †Donaldina americana
 †Donaldina fountainensis – type locality for species
 †Donaldina marigoldensis
 †Donaldina pygmaea – type locality for species
 †Dorycrinus
 †Dorycrinus mississippiensis
 †Dragonympha – type locality for genus
 †Dragonympha srokai – type locality for species
 †Dudleyaspis
 †Dudleyaspis vanhornei

E

 †Echinaria
 †Echinoconchus
 †Echinoconchus alternatus
   †Edestus
 †Edestus crenulatus – type locality for species
 †Edestus serratus – type locality for species
 †Edmondia
 †Edmondia ovata
 †Eileticus – type locality for genus
 †Eileticus aequalis – type locality for species
 †Eileticus anthracinus – type locality for species
 †Elasmonema
 †Elasmonema corrugata
 †Elaterites
 †Elaterites triferens
 †Elibatocrinus
 †Elibatocrinus elegans – type locality for species
   †Elonichthys
 †Elonichthys disjunctus – type locality for species
 †Elonichthys peltigerus
 †Elonichthys perpennatus
  †Encrinurus
 †Encrinurus egani
 †Endelocrinus
 †Endelocrinus tumidus
 †Endoiasmus – type locality for genus
 †Endoiasmus reticulatus – type locality for species
 †Endosporites
 †Endosporites globiformis
 †Endosporites plicatus
 †Enoploura
 †Enteletes
 †Enteletes hemiplicata
 †Eoasinites
 †Eobronteus
 †Eobronteus slocomi
 †Eoctonus – type locality for genus
 †Eoctonus miniatus – type locality for species
 †Eodictyonella
 †Eohalysiocrinus – tentative report
 †Eolissochonetes
 †Eomartiniopsis
 †Eomartiniopsis kinderhookensis
 †Eophacops
 †Eophacops handwerki
 †Eoplectodonta
 †Eoscorpius – type locality for genus
 †Eoscorpius carbonarius – type locality for species
 †Eospirifer
 †Eospirifer radiatus
 †Eospirigerina
 †Eospirigerina putilla
 †Eotrochus
 †Eotrochus marigoldensis
 †Ephippioceras
 †Ephippioceras moinellae – type locality for species
 †Epideigma – type locality for genus
 †Epideigma elegans – type locality for species
 †Eremopteris
 †Eremopteris grandis
 †Eremopteris inaequilateralis
 †Erisocrinus
 †Erisocrinus typus
 †Erratencrinurus
 †Erratencrinurus vigilans
 †Escharopora
 †Escharopora patens
 †Eubleptus – type locality for genus
 †Eubleptus danielsi – type locality for species
 †Eubleptus maculosus – type locality for species
 †Eubrodia – type locality for genus
 †Eubrodia dabasinskasi – type locality for species
 †Eucaenus – type locality for genus
 †Eucaenus ovalis – type locality for species
 †Eucaenus pusillus – type locality for species
 †Eucaenus rotundatus – type locality for species
   †Eucalyptocrinites
 †Eucalyptocrinites asper
 †Eucalyptocrinites crassus
 †Eucalyptocrinites depressus
 †Eucalyptocrinites egani
 †Eucalyptocrinites inornatus
 †Eucalyptocrinites ornatus
 †Eucalyptocrinites rotundus
 †Euchondria
 †Euchondria levicula
 †Euconospira
 †Euconospira sturgeoni
 †Euconospira waterlooensis – type locality for species
 †Eudoxina
 †Eudoxina subrotunda
 †Euhydrodiskos – type locality for genus
 †Euhydrodiskos diktyotos – type locality for species
 †Eumetria
 †Eumetria vera
 †Eumicrerpeton – type locality for genus
 †Eumicrerpeton parvum – type locality for species
 †Eunema
 †Eunema centralis – type locality for species
 †Eunema fasciata – type locality for species
  †Euomphalus
 †Euomphalus planodorsatus
 †Euomphalus similis
 †Euonychocrinus
 †Euonychocrinus simplex – type locality for species
 †Euphemerites
 †Euphemerites affinis – type locality for species
 †Euphemerites gigas – type locality for species
 †Euphemerites simplex – type locality for species
 †Euphemites
 †Euphemites callosus – type locality for species
 †Euphemites carbonarius
 †Euphemites lentiformis – type locality for species
 †Euphemites randolphensis – type locality for species
  †Euphoberia – type locality for genus
 †Euphoberia anguilla – type locality for species
 †Euphoberia armigera – type locality for species
 †Euphoberia carri – type locality for species
 †Euphoberia cuspidata – type locality for species
 †Euphoberia flabellata – type locality for species
 †Euphoberia granosa
 †Euphoberia horrida – type locality for species
 †Euphoberia hystricosa – type locality for species
 †Euphoberia simplex – type locality for species
 †Euphoberia spinulosa – type locality for species
 †Euphoberia tracta – type locality for species
 †Euryzone
 †Euryzone latitornata
 †Eusphenopteris
 †Eusphenopteris morrowensis
 †Exallaspis
 †Exallaspis illinoisensis
 †Exocrinus
 †Exocrinus wanni
 †Exoriocrinus – type locality for genus
 †Exoriocrinus lasallensis

F

 †Fasciculiconcha
 †Fasciculiconcha knighti
   †Favosites
 †Fenestella
 †Ferganella
 †Fistulipora
 †Fistulipora excellens
 †Fistulipora incrustans
 †Fistulipora perdensa
 †Fletcheria
 †Florinites
 †Florinites antiquus
 †Florinites grandis
 †Florinites mediapudens
 †Florinites mediaudens
 †Florinites millotti
 †Florinites similis
 †Florinites triletus
 †Florinites visendus
 †Florinites volans
 †Fraipontia
 †Fraipontia bella – type locality for species

G

 †Galateacrinus
 †Galateacrinus coacervatus – type locality for species
 †Gazacrinus
 †Gazacrinus major
 †Gazacrinus minor
 †Genentomum – type locality for genus
 †Genentomum validum – type locality for species
 †Geralinura
 †Geralinura carbonaria – type locality for species
 †Gerapompus
 †Gerapompus blattinoides – type locality for species
 †Gerapompus extensus – type locality for species
 †Gerapompus schucherti – type locality for species
 †Geraroides
 †Geraroides maximus – type locality for species
 †Gerarulus – type locality for genus
 †Gerarulus radialis – type locality for species
 †Gerarus – type locality for genus
 †Gerarus collaris – type locality for species
 †Gerarus constrictus – type locality for species
 †Gerarus danielsi – type locality for species
 †Gerarus mazonus – type locality for species
 †Gerarus vetus – type locality for species
 †Geratarbus – type locality for genus
 †Geratarbus lacoei – type locality for species
 †Gigantopteris
 †Gigantopteris dawsoni
 †Gigantopteris ovata
 †Girtyella
 †Girtyella indianensis
 †Girtyspira
 †Girtyspira canaliculata
 †Girtyspira pygmaea – type locality for species
 †Gissocrinus
 †Glabrocingulum
 †Glabrocingulum chesterensis
 †Glabrocingulum grayvillense
 †Glaphyrophlebia – type locality for genus
 †Glaphyrophlebia pusilla – type locality for species
   †Glikmanius
 †Glikmanius occidentalis
 †Globozyga
 †Globozyga tenuistriata
  †Glyptambon
 †Glyptambon verrucosus
 †Glyptopleura
 †Glyptopleura costata
 †Gomphocystites
 †Gondolella
 †Gondolella pohli
 †Gonioloboceras
 †Gonioloboceras parrishi – type locality for species
 †Goniophora – tentative report
 †Gosseletina
 †Gosseletina johnsoni
 †Gosseletina subglobosa
 †Grabauphyllum
 †Grabauphyllum johnstoni
 †Graeophonus
 †Graeophonus scudderi – type locality for species
 †Granasporites
 †Granasporites medius
 †Granulatispoites
 †Granulatispoites piroformis
 †Granulatisporites
 †Granulatisporites adnatoides
 †Granulatisporites granularis
 †Granulatisporites granulatus
 †Granulatisporites livingstonensis
 †Granulatisporites microgranifer
 †Granulatisporites minutus
 †Granulatisporites pallidus
 †Granulatisporites pannosites
 †Granulatisporites parvus – or unidentified comparable form
 †Granulatisporites piroformis
 †Granulatisporites verrucosus
  †Greenops
   †Greererpeton
 †Greererpeton burkmorani
 †Griffithidella
 †Griffithidella alternata
 †Griffithidella doris
 †Grumosisporites
 †Grumosisporites rufus – or unidentified comparable form
 †Grumosisporites varioreticulatus
 †Gulpenia
 †Gulpenia limburgensis
 †Gypidula
 †Gyrophlebia – type locality for genus
 †Gyrophlebia longicollis – type locality for species

H

 †Hadentomum – type locality for genus
 †Hadentomum americanum – type locality for species
 †Hadrachne – type locality for genus
 †Hadrachne horribilis – type locality for species
 †Haeretocrinus
 †Haeretocrinus macoupinesis
 †Haeretocrinus wagneri – type locality for species
 †Hagnocrinus – tentative report
 †Hagnocrinus dubius
 †Hallicystis
 †Hallicystis elongata
   †Hallopora – tentative report
 †Halogetocrinus – type locality for genus
 †Halogetocrinus paucus
   †Halysites
 †Hamburgia
 †Hamburgia typa
 †Harmostocrinus – type locality for genus
 †Harmostocrinus porosus – type locality for species
 †Harpidella
 †Harpidium
 †Hebertella
 †Hedeina
 †Helenodora – type locality for genus
 †Helenodora inopinata – type locality for species
 †Helicotoma
 †Helicotoma planulata
 †Heliolites
 †Heliomeroides
 †Heliomeroides raymondi
 †Hemeristia – type locality for genus
 †Hemeristia occidentalis – type locality for species
 †Hemiarges
 †Herdina – type locality for genus
 †Herdina mirificus – type locality for species
 †Heslerodus
 †Heslerodus divergens
 †Hesperorthis
 †Heteralosia
 †Heteralosia beecheri
 †Heterologus – type locality for genus
 †Heterologus langfordorum – type locality for species
 †Heterotarbus – type locality for genus
 †Heterotarbus ovatus – type locality for species
 †Hexacrinites
 †Hexacrinites mississippiensis – type locality for species
 †Holcospermum
 †Holia
 †Holia magnaspina
 †Holocystites
 †Holocystites alternatus
 †Holocystites cylindricus
 †Holocystites scutellatus – type locality for species
 †Holocystites spangleri
 †Holocystites sphaericus
 †Homaloneura
 †Homaloneura dabasinskasi – type locality for species
 †Homocrinus – tentative report
 †Homoeospira
 †Homotelus
 †Homotelus laeviurus
 †Howellella
 †Hustedia
 †Hustedia marmoni
 †Hybochilocrinus
 †Hybochilocrinus americanus
 †Hymenospora
 †Hymenospora multirugosa
 †Hymenospora paucirugosa
 
 †Hyolithes
 †Hyolithes striatus
 †Hypergonia
 †Hypergonia baldwinensis
 †Hypergonia illinoiensis – type locality for species
 †Hypergonia marvinwelleri
 †Hypermegethes – type locality for genus
 †Hypermegethes schucherti – type locality for species
 †Hypselocrinus
 †Hypselocrinus maccabei
 †Hystrichopsydrax – type locality for genus
 †Hystrichopsydrax sandersi – type locality for species
 †Hystriculina
 †Hystriculina texana

I

 †Ianthinopsis – tentative report
 †Icthyocrinus
 †Icthyocrinus subangularis
 †Illaenoides
 †Illaenoides triloba
 †Ilyodes
 †Ilyodes divisa – type locality for species
 †Ilyodes elongata – type locality for species
 †Indospora
 †Indospora boletus
 †Indospora stewarti
 †Ischadites
 †Ischadites koenigi
 †Isoallagecrinus
 †Isoallagecrinus lasallensis – type locality for species
  †Isodectes
 †Isodectes obtusus
 †Isorophus – tentative report
 †Isorthis
  †Isotelus
 †Isotelus gigas
 †Isotelus maximus

J

 †Jimpohlia – type locality for genus
 †Jimpohlia erinacea – type locality for species
 †Juresania
 †Juresania symmetrica

K

 †Kanabinocrinus – tentative report
 †Kankakeea – type locality for genus
 †Kankakeea grundyi – type locality for species
 †Kaskia
 †Kaskia chesterensis
 †Kewaneesporites
 †Kewaneesporites reticulatus
 †Kewaneesporites reticuloides
  †Kionoceras
 †Kitakamithyris
 †Kitakamithyris cooperensis
 †Kloedenella – tentative report
 †Knorria
 †Knorria imbricata – or unidentified comparable form
 †Knoxisporites
 †Knoxisporites rotatus
 †Knoxisporites stephanephorus
 †Knoxisporites triradiatus
 †Kosankeisporites
 †Kosankeisporites elegans
 †Kosovopeltis
 †Kozlowskia
 †Kozlowskia splendens
 †Kozlowskiella
 †Kozlowskiella inexpectata – type locality for species
 †Kronoscorpio
 †Kronoscorpio danielsi – type locality for species
 †Kustarachne – type locality for genus
 †Kustarachne tenuipes – type locality for species
 †Kutorginella
 †Kutorginella lasallensis

L

 †Lacoea
 †Lacoea seriata
 †Laevigatosporites
 †Laevigatosporites desmoinensis
 †Laevigatosporites desmoinesensis
 †Laevigatosporites globosus
 †Laevigatosporites medius
 †Laevigatosporites minutus
 †Laevigatosporites ovalis
 †Laevigatosporites punctatus
 †Laevigatosporites vulgaris
 †Lagenospermum
 †Lameereites – type locality for genus
 †Lameereites curvipennis – type locality for species
 †Lampterocrinus
 †Lampterocrinus inflatus
 †Larryia – type locality for genus
 †Larryia osterbergi – type locality for species
 †Latosporites
 †Latosporites minutus
  †Latzelia – type locality for genus
 †Latzelia primordialis – type locality for species
 †Laudonocrinus
 †Laudonocrinus subsinuatus
 †Leangella
 †Lecanocrinus
 †Lecthaylus - type locality for genus
 †Lecthaylus gregarius - type locality for species
 †Leiotriletes
 †Leiotriletes adnatoides
 †Leiotriletes atshanensis – or unidentified comparable form
 †Leiotriletes gracilis
 †Leiotriletes levis
 †Leiotriletes notatus
 †Leiotriletes parvus
 †Leiotriletes pseudolevis
 †Lepadocystis
 †Lepetopsis
 †Lepetopsis chesterensis
 †Lepidocarpon
 †Lepidocyclus
   †Lepidodendron
 †Lepidodendron aculeatum
 †Lepidodendron oblongifolium
 †Lepidodendron veltheimii – or unidentified comparable form
 †Lepidodendron volkmannianum
 †Lepidodendron wortheni
 †Lepidophloios
 †Lepidophylloides
 †Lepidophyllum
 †Lepidophyllum campbelleanum
 †Lepidostrobophyllum
 †Lepidostrobus
 †Leptaena
 †Leptaena aequalis
 †Leptaena rhomboidalis
 †Leptagonia
 †Leptagonia missouriensis – or unidentified comparable form
 †Leptodesma
 †Leptodesma ehlersi – or unidentified comparable form
 †Leptodesma laevis
 †Leptoptygma
 †Leptoptygma fountainensis – type locality for species
 †Leptoptygma golconda
 †Lesleya
 †Lesleya cheimarosa – type locality for species
 †Lichas
 †Lichas pugnax
  †Lingula
 †Lingula carbonaria
 †Lingula lamellata
 †Linoproductus
 †Linoproductus prattenianus
 †Linopteris
 †Linopteris rubella
 †Liospira – tentative report
 †Liroceras
 †Liroceras liratum
 †Lissatrypa – tentative report
 †Lissochonetes
 †Lissochonetes geinitzianus
 †Lissomartus
 †Lissomartus schucherti – type locality for species
 †Listroncanthus
 †Lithoneura – type locality for genus
 †Lithoneura clayesi – type locality for species
 †Lithoneura lameerei – type locality for species
 †Lithoneura mirifica – type locality for species
 †Lithoneura piecko – type locality for species
  Lithophaga – tentative report
 †Lithophaga subelliptica
 †Litostrobus – or unidentified comparable form
 †Litostrobus iowensis
 †Lobeatta – type locality for genus
 †Lobeatta schneideri – type locality for species
 †Lophophyllidium
 †Lophophyllidium proliferum
 †Lophospira
 †Lophospira obliqua
 †Lophospira perangulata
 †Lophospira serrulata
 †Lophotriletes
 †Lophotriletes comissuralis
 †Lophotriletes commissuralis
 †Lophotriletes copiosus
 †Lophotriletes gibbosus
 †Lophotriletes granoornatus – or unidentified comparable form
 †Lophotriletes ibrahimi
 †Lophotriletes microsaetosus
 †Lophotriletes mosaicus
 †Lophotriletes pseudaculeatus
 †Lophotriletes rarispinosus
 †Lycodemas – type locality for genus
 †Lycodemas adolescens – type locality for species
 †Lycospora
 †Lycospora brevijuga
 †Lycospora granulata
 †Lycospora micropapillata
 †Lycospora noctuina
 †Lycospora orbicula
 †Lycospora paulula
 †Lycospora pellucida
 †Lycospora punctata
 †Lycospora pusilla
 †Lycospora rotunda
 †Lycospora subjuga
 †Lycospora torquifer
 †Lyellia
 †Lyellia thebesensis
 †Lygdozoon
 †Lygdozoon arkansana
 †Lyriocrinus
 †Lyriocrinus melissa
  †Lysorophus – type locality for genus
 †Lysorophus tricarinatus – type locality for species

M

 †Macrocrinus
 †Macrocrinus mundulus
 †Macrostylocrinus
 †Macrostylocrinus striatus
 †Macrostylocrinus subglobosus
 †Maculatasporites
 †Maculatasporites punctatus
 †Mammia – type locality for genus
 †Mammia alutacea – type locality for species
 †Mariopteris
 †Mariopteris occidentalis
 †Mariopteris pygmaea
 †Mariopteris sillimanni
 †Mariopteris speciosa
 †Marsupiocrinus
 †Marsupiocrinus chicagoensis
 †Mazoglossus
 †Mazoglossus ramsdelli – type locality for species
 †Mazonia – type locality for genus
 †Mazonia woodiana – type locality for species
 †Mazonopterum – type locality for genus
 †Mazonopterum wolfforum – type locality for species
 †Mazostachys
 †Mazostachys pendulata
 †Mazothairos – type locality for genus
 †Mazothairos enormis – type locality for species
 †Mcluckiepteron – type locality for genus
 †Mcluckiepteron luciae – type locality for species
 †Meekopora
 †Meekopora eximia
 †Meekospira
 †Meekospira bambooformis
 †Meekospira batteni
 †Meekospira evansvillensis
 †Meekospira minuta – type locality for species
 †Megalometer – type locality for genus
 †Megalometer lata – type locality for species
 †Megastrophia
 †Megastrophia profunda
 †Megathentomum – type locality for genus
 †Megathentomum pustulatum – type locality for species
 †Megathentomum scudderi – type locality for species
 †Megistocrinus
 †Melinophlebia – type locality for genus
 †Melinophlebia analis – type locality for species
 †Melocrinites
 †Melocrinites obpyramidalis
 †Merista
 †Meristina
 †Mesoblastus – tentative report
 †Mesolobus
 †Mesoplica
 †Mesoplica mesicostalis – tentative report
 †Metacheliphlebia
 †Metacheliphlebia elongata – type locality for species
 †Metachorus
 †Metachorus testudo – type locality for species
  †Metacoceras
 †Metacoceras copei – type locality for species
 †Metaconularia
 †Metaconularia manni
 †Metatarbus – type locality for genus
 †Metatarbus triangularis – type locality for species
 †Metopolichas
 †Metopolichas breviceps
 †Miamia – type locality for genus
 †Miamia bronsoni – type locality for species
 †Microcaracrinus
 †Microcaracrinus conjugulus – type locality for species
 †Microreticulatisporites
 †Microreticulatisporites concavus
 †Microreticulatisporites harrisonii
 †Microreticulatisporites lunatus
 †Microreticulatisporites nobilis
 †Microreticulatisporites sulcatus
 †Milosaurus – type locality for genus
 †Milosaurus mccordi – type locality for species
 †Miobatrachus – type locality for genus
 †Miobatrachus romeri – type locality for species
 †Mischoptera
 †Mischoptera douglassi – type locality for species
 †Modiolopsis
 †Modiomorpha
 †Modiomorpha concentrica
 †Modiomorphella
  †Monograptus
 †Monograptus dubius
 †Monograptus vomerinus
 †Monomuchites
 †Monomuchites annularis
 †Monopteria
 †Monopteria longa
 †Mooreisporites
 †Mooreisporites inusitatus
 †Mooreoceras
 †Moundocrinus
 †Moundocrinus osagensis – or unidentified comparable form
 †Mourlonia
 †Mulceodens
 †Mulceodens sibleyense – or unidentified related form
 †Murchisonia
 †Murchisonia akidota
 †Murchisonia anderdoniae
 †Murchisonia sibleyensis
 †Murospora
 †Murospora kosankei
 †Myelodactylus
 †Mylacris – type locality for genus
 †Mylacris ampla – type locality for species
 †Mylacris anthracophila – type locality for species
 †Mylacris antiqua – type locality for species
 †Mylacris diplodiscus – type locality for species
 †Mylacris sellardsi
 †Mylacris similis – type locality for species
 †Myriotheca
 †Myriotheca arnoldi – type locality for species
 †Myriotheca scaberrima
 †Mysticocrinus – report made of unidentified related form or using admittedly obsolete nomenclature
 †Myxinikela – type locality for genus
 †Myxinikela siroka – type locality for species

N

 †Nacekomia – type locality for genus
 †Nacekomia rossae – type locality for species
 †Narkema – type locality for genus
 †Narkema taeniatum – type locality for species
 †Naticonema
  †Naticopsis
 †Naticopsis carleyana
 †Naticopsis planifrons
 †Naticopsis waterlooensis – type locality for species
 †Nectoptilus – type locality for genus
 †Nectoptilus mazonus – type locality for species
 †Neilsonia
 †Neilsonia welleri
 †Nemastomoides – type locality for genus
 †Nemastomoides longipes – type locality for species
 †Nemavermes – type locality for genus
 †Nemavermes mackeei – type locality for species
 †Neochonetes
 †Neochonetes granulifer
 †Neofouquea – type locality for genus
 †Neofouquea suzanneae – type locality for species
  †Neospirifer
 †Neospirifer dunbari
 †Neospirifer triplicatus
  †Neuropteris
 †Neuropteris clarksoni
 †Neuropteris dussarti
 †Neuropteris ovata
 †Neuropteris parvifolia
 †Neuropteris rarinervis
 †Neuropteris scheuchzeri
 †Neuropteris schlehani
 †Neuropteris tennesseeana
 †Neuropteris tenuifolia
 †Nigeroplica
 †Nigeroplica illinoisensis – tentative report
 †Nodonema
 †Nodonema granulatum
 †Nucleospira
 †Nucleospira minima
   Nucula
 †Nuculoidea – tentative report
 †Nuculopsis
 †Nuculopsis girtyi
 †Nummicrinus
 †Nummicrinus waukoma

O

 †Odontopteris
 †Oligocarpia
 †Oligotypus
 †Oligotypus makowskii – type locality for species
 †Onychopterella – tentative report
 †Onychopterella pumilis
 †Ootarbus – type locality for genus
 †Ootarbus ovatus – type locality for species
 †Ootarbus pulcher – type locality for species
 †Opiliotarbus
 †Opiliotarbus elongatus – type locality for species
 †Orbiculoidea
 †Orbiculoidea missouriensis
 †Orbinaria
 †Orbinaria brownensis – tentative report
 †Orthomylacris
 †Orthomylacris contorta – type locality for species
 †Orthomylacris gurleyi – type locality for species
 †Orthomylacris mansfieldi
 †Orthomylacris rigida – type locality for species
 †Orthonychia
 †Orthonychia chesterense
 †Orthospirifer
 †Orthospirifer iowensis
 †Orthotarbus
 †Orthotarbus minutus – type locality for species
 †Orthotarbus robustus – type locality for species
 †Otarion
 †Ovatia
 †Ovatia nascens
 †Ovopteris
 †Ovopteris communis
 †Oxynoblatta
 †Oxynoblatta triangularis – type locality for species
 †Oxyprora
 †Oxyprora mesialis – type locality for species
 †Oxyprora prattenanum – type locality for species

P

 †Pachystrophia – tentative report
 †Palaeobuthus – type locality for genus
 †Palaeobuthus distinctus – type locality for species
 †Palaeocarria – type locality for genus
 †Palaeocarria ornata – type locality for species
 †Palaeodictyopteron – report made of unidentified related form or using admittedly obsolete nomenclature
 †Palaeodictyopteron latipenne – type locality for species
 †Palaeodictyopteron mazonum – type locality for species
 †Palaeolima
 †Palaeolima equistriata
 †Palaeolima retifer
 †Palaeolima retifera
 †Palaeoneilo
 †Palaeoneilo taffiana
 †Palaeopisthacanthus – type locality for genus
 †Palaeopisthacanthus schucherti – type locality for species
 †Palaeopteridium
 †Palaeopteridium reussii
 †Palaeostachys
 †Palaeostachys andrewsii
 †Palaeostylus
 †Palaeozygopleura
 †Palaeozygopleura venusta
 †Palaeozygopleura welleri
 †Palaeozygopleura wortheni – type locality for species
 †Palaiotaptus – type locality for genus
 †Palaiotaptus mazonus – type locality for species
 †Palenarthrus – type locality for genus
 †Palenarthrus impressus – type locality for species
 †Paleospora
 †Paleospora fragila
 †Palmatopteris
 †Parachaetetes
 †Paraconularia
 †Paraisobuthus
 †Paraisobuthus virginiae – type locality for species
 †Parajuresania
 †Parajuresania nebrascensis
 †Parallelodon
 †Parallelodon obsoletus
 †Parallelodon sangamonensis
 †Parallelora
 †Parallelora nupera
 †Paralogopsis – type locality for genus
 †Paralogopsis longipes – type locality for species
 †Paramphicrinus – type locality for genus
 †Paramphicrinus oklahomaensis – type locality for species
 †Parapaolia
 †Parapaolia superba – type locality for species
 †Paraparchites
 †Paraparchites carbonaria
 †Paraparchites nicklesi
 †Paraphorhynchus
 †Paraphorhynchus striatocostatum
 †Paratarbus – type locality for genus
 †Paratarbus carbonarius – type locality for species
 †Pareinoblatta
 †Pareinoblatta sellardsi – type locality for species
 †Paromylacris
 †Paromylacris ampla – type locality for species
 †Paromylacris rotunda – type locality for species
 †Parulocrinus
 †Parulocrinus pontiacensis – type locality for species
 †Patellilabia
 †Patellilabia chesterensis
 †Paucicrura
 †Paucijaculum – type locality for genus
 †Paucijaculum samamithion – type locality for species
 †Paupospira
 †Paupospira thebesensis – type locality for species
  †Pecopteris
 †Pecopteris plumosa
 †Pecopteris serrulata
 †Pecopteris vestita
 †Pendulostachys – type locality for genus
 †Pendulostachys cingulariformis – type locality for species
 †Pentaramicrinus
 †Pentaramicrinus bimagnaramus
  †Pentremites
 †Pentremites clavatus
 †Pentremites godoni
 †Pentremites obesus
 †Pentremites okawensis
 †Pentremites pyriformis
 †Pentremites springeri
 †Pentremites tulipaformis
 †Pentremoblastus
 †Pericalyphe – type locality for genus
 †Pericalyphe longa – type locality for species
  †Periechocrinus
 †Periechocrinus chicagoensis
 †Periechocrinus infelix
 †Periechocrinus marcouanus
 †Periechocrinus necis
 †Periechocrinus urniformis
 †Pernopecten
 †Pernopecten attenuatus – tentative report
 †Pernopecten ohioensis
 †Perotriletes
 †Perotriletes parvigracilus
 †Petrochus
 †Petrochus conica
 †Petrochus mellaria – or unidentified comparable form
   †Phacops
 †Phacops norwoodensis
 †Phanerotrema
 †Pharkidonotus
 †Pharkidonotus harrodi – type locality for species
 †Pharkidonotus percarinatus
 †Phascolophyllaphycus
 †Phascolophyllaphycus lohrensis
 †Phestia
 †Phestia bellistriatus
   †Phlegethontia
 †Phlegethontia longissima – type locality for species
 †Phlyctiscapha
 †Phragmoceras
 †Phragmolites
 †Phragmolites multinotatus – type locality for species
 †Phyloblatta
 †Phyloblatta diversipennis – type locality for species
 †Phyloblatta hilliana – type locality for species
 †Phymatopleura
 †Pilosisporites
 †Pilosisporites williamsii
 †Pisocrinus
 †Pityosporites
 †Planisporites
 †Planisporites granifer
   †Platyceras
 †Platyceras lineata
 †Platyceras subrotundum
 †Platycrinus
 †Platylichas
 †Platymylacris
 †Platymylacris paucinervis – type locality for species
    †Platysomus
 †Platysomus circularis
  †Platystrophia
 †Platystrophia biforata
 †Platyzona
 †Plectatrypa
 †Pleophrynus – type locality for genus
 †Pleophrynus ensifer – type locality for species
 †Pleurojulus
 †Pleurojulus biornatus – or unidentified comparable form
 †Plicochonetes
 †Plicochonetes glenparkensis – tentative report
 †Plummericrinus
 †Plummericrinus erectus
 †Pohlispongia – type locality for genus
 †Pohlispongia monosphaera – type locality for species
 †Pojetaconcha
 †Pojetaconcha limatula
 †Poliochera – type locality for genus
 †Poliochera gibbsi – type locality for species
 †Poliochera glabra – type locality for species
 †Poliochera punctulata – type locality for species
 †Polusocrinus
 †Polusocrinus avanti
 †Polyernus – type locality for genus
 †Polyernus complanatus – type locality for species
 †Polyetes – type locality for genus
 †Polyetes furcifer – type locality for species
 †Polygonocrinus
 †Polygonocrinus spiniferus – type locality for species
  †Polysentor – type locality for genus
 †Polysentor gorbairdi – type locality for species
 †Porcellia
 †Porcellia chesterensis
 †Poteriocrinus – tentative report
 †Potonieisporites
 †Potonieisporites elegans
 †Priapulites – type locality for genus
 †Priapulites konecniorum – type locality for species
 †Probletocrinus – type locality for genus
 †Probletocrinus curtus – type locality for species
 †Prochoroptera – type locality for genus
 †Prochoroptera calopteryx – type locality for species
 †Procoronaspora
 †Procoronaspora dumosa
 †Prodentalium
 †Productella
 †Productella subalata
  †Proetus
 †Proetus canalis
 †Proetus determinatus
 †Proetus handwerki
 †Progenentomum – type locality for genus
 †Progenentomum carbonis – type locality for species
 †Promexyele
 †Promexyele peyeri
 †Promylacris
 †Promylacris ovalis – type locality for species
 †Promytilus – tentative report
 †Promytilus annosus
 †Protatrypa
 †Protoblattoidea – report made of unidentified related form or using admittedly obsolete nomenclature
 †Protoblattoidea minor
 †Protoblattoidea sellardsi
 †Protodictyon – type locality for genus
 †Protodictyon pulchripenne – type locality for species
 †Protoleptostrophia
 †Protomegastrophia
   †Protophasma
 †Protophasma galtieri – type locality for species
 †Protopilio
 †Protopilio depressus – type locality for species
 †Protoscolex
 †Protoscolex ruedemanni
 †Protosolpuga – type locality for genus
 †Protosolpuga carbonaria – type locality for species
 †Pseudaviculopecten
 †Pseudaviculopecten princeps
 †Pseudoatrypa
 †Pseudoatrypa devoniana
 †Pseudogerarus – type locality for genus
 †Pseudogerarus scudderi – type locality for species
 †Pseudomonotis
 †Pseudomonotis equistriata
  †Pseudophlegethontia – type locality for genus
 †Pseudophlegethontia turnbullorum – type locality for species
 †Pseudorthoceras
 †Pseudorthoceras knoxense
 †Pseudosphonophyton
 †Pseudosphonophyton höegii – type locality for species
 †Pseudozygopleura
 †Pseudozygopleura yandellana – or unidentified comparable form
 †Pterinea
 †Pterinea thebesensis
 †Pterochiton
 †Pterochiton carbonarius – type locality for species
 †Pteronites
 †Pterotheca
 †Pterotheca triangularis – type locality for species
 †Pterotocrinus
 †Pterotocrinus abruptus
 †Pterotocrinus armatus
 †Pterotocrinus capitalis
 †Pterotocrinus coronarius
 †Pterotocrinus lingulaformis
 †Pterotocrinus rugosus
 †Ptychocarpus
 †Pulchratia – tentative report
 †Pulchratia symmetrica
 †Punctatisporites
 †Punctatisporites aerarius
 †Punctatisporites curviradiatus
 †Punctatisporites decorus
 †Punctatisporites edgarensis
 †Punctatisporites flavus
 †Punctatisporites glaber
 †Punctatisporites gracilirugosus – or unidentified comparable form
 †Punctatisporites irrasus
 †Punctatisporites kankakeensis
 †Punctatisporites minutus
 †Punctatisporites nahannensis
 †Punctatisporites obesus
 †Punctatisporites obliquus
 †Punctatisporites orbicularis
 †Punctatisporites pseudolevatus – or unidentified comparable form
 †Punctatisporites vermiculatus
 †Punctatosporites
 †Punctatosporites minutus
 †Punctospirifer
 †Punctospirifer kentuckensis
 †Punctospirifer transversus
 †Pustulatisporites
 †Pustulatisporites crenatus
 †Pustulatisporties
 †Pustulatisporties crenatus
 †Pycnosaccus
 †Pyrgocystis

Q

 †Quadrochonetes
 †Quadrochonetes geronticus
 †Quasillinites
 †Quasillinites diversiformis

R

 †Radiizonates
 †Radiizonates striatus
 †Rafinesquina
 †Rafinesquina mesicosta
 †Raistrickia
 †Raistrickia abdita
 †Raistrickia aculeata
 †Raistrickia aculeolata
 †Raistrickia breveminens
 †Raistrickia brevemines
 †Raistrickia carbondalensis
 †Raistrickia crinita
 †Raistrickia crocea
 †Raistrickia dispar
 †Raistrickia fibrata – or unidentified comparable form
 †Raistrickia grovensis
 †Raistrickia irregularis
 †Raistrickia lacerata
 †Raistrickia lowellensis
 †Raistrickia pilosa
 †Raistrickia pontiacensis
 †Raistrickia prisca
 †Raistrickia solaria
 †Raistrickia subcrinita
 †Raistrickia superba
 †Rasstriga – type locality for genus
 †Rasstriga americana – type locality for species
 †Redstockia
 †Reinschospora
 †Reinschospora magnifica
 †Reinschospora triangularis
 †Remopleurides
 †Remopleurides missouriensis
 †Renaultia
 †Renisporites
 †Renisporites confossus
 †Resserella
 †Reticulariiina
 †Reticulariiina spinosa
 †Reticulariina
 †Reticulariina spinosa
 †Reticulatia
 †Reticulatia huecoensis
 †Reticulatisporites
 †Reticulatisporites lacunosus
 †Reticulatisporites muricatus
 †Reticulatisporites polygonalis
 †Reticulatisporites reticulatus
 †Reticulatisporites splendens
 †Reticulograptus
 †Reticulograptus polymorphus
 †Retispira
 †Retispira monronensis – type locality for species
 †Retispira nodocostata – type locality for species
 †Retispira ornatus – type locality for species
 †Rhabdoxylon
 †Rhabdoxylon americanum – type locality for species
 †Rhineoderma
 †Rhineoderma piasaensis – type locality for species
 †Rhipidium
 †Rhipidomella
 †Rhipidomella carbonaria
 †Rhipidomella rockportensis
  †Rhodea
 †Rhodea trichomanoides – or unidentified comparable form
 †Rhodeopteridium
 †Rhodeopteridium phillipsii – type locality for species
 †Rhombopora
 †Rhynchogonium
 †Rhynchogonium fayettevillense
  †Rhynchonella
 †Rhynchopora
 †Rhynchopora hamburgensis
 †Rhynchopora prisca
 †Rhynchopora pustulosa
 †Rhynchotreta
 †Rugosochonetes
 †Rugosochonetes gregarius – or unidentified comparable form
 †Rugosochonetes pikensis
 †Ruthiphiala
 †Ruthiphiala sublaevis

S

 †Saccoglossus
 †Saccoglossus testa – type locality for species
 †Saetograptus
 †Saetograptus colonus
 †Sagenodus
 †Sagenodus cristatus – type locality for species
 †Sagittoceras
 †Sagittoceras hathawayanum – type locality for species
 †Salterospira
 †Salterospira chesterensis
 †Salterospira okawensis
 †Salvadorea
 †Salvadorea randi
 †Samaropsis
 †Savagella
 †Savagella illinoisensis
 †Savagella lindahli
 †Savitrisporites
 †Savitrisporites asperatus
 †Savitrisporites majus
 †Savitrisporites nux
 †Scepasma – type locality for genus
 †Scepasma gigas – type locality for species
 †Sceptropora
 †Sceptropora facula
 †Schizodus
 †Schizophoria
 †Schizophoria hortonensis
 †Schizophoria iowensis
 †Schizotreta
 †Schizotreta tenuilamellata
 †Schondorfia – type locality for genus
 †Schondorfia fungosa – type locality for species
 †Schopfites
 †Schopfites carbondalensis
 †Schopfites colchesterensis
 †Schopfites dimorphus
 †Schuchertella
 †Schuchertella hardinensis
 †Schuchertella louisianaensis
 †Schuchertella propinqua
 †Schuchertiella – type locality for genus
 †Schuchertiella gracilis – type locality for species
 †Schulzospora
 †Schulzospora rara
 †Sciadiocrinus
 †Sciadiocrinus tegillum – type locality for species
 †Scolecopteris – tentative report
 †Sedenticellula
 †Sedenticellula hamburgensis
 †Selenella
 †Selenella pediculus
 †Semiproductus
 †Senftenbergia
 †Sentosia
 †Sentosia ignota – tentative report
 †Septameroceras
 †Serpulopsis
 †Serpulospira
 †Serpulospira diversiformis
 †Shansiella
 †Shansiella broadheadi – tentative report
 †Shumardella
 †Shumardella fracta
 †Sievertsia
   †Sigillaria
 †Sigillaria mamillaris – or unidentified comparable form
 †Sigillaria rugosa
 †Sigillariostrobus
 †Silphion – type locality for genus
 †Silphion latipenne – type locality for species
 †Similihariotta – type locality for genus
 †Similihariotta dabasinskasi – type locality for species
 † Simplicius
 †Simplicius simplex – type locality for species
 †Sinuspores
 †Sinuspores sinuatus
 †Siphonocrinus
 †Siphonocrinus nobilis
 †Skenidioides
  Solemya
 †Solemya trapezoides
 †Soleniscus
 †Soleniscus primogenius
 †Solenochilus
 †Solenochilus shumwayense – type locality for species
 †Sorellophrynus – type locality for genus
 †Sorellophrynus carbonarius – type locality for species
 †Spackmanites
 †Spackmanites facierugosus – or unidentified comparable form
 †Spackmanites habibii
  †Sphaerexochus
 †Sphaerexochus roemingeri
 †Sphaerexochus romingeri
 †Sphaerocoryphe
 †Sphaerocoryphe arachniformis
  †Sphenophyllum
 †Sphenophyllum cuneifolium
 †Sphenophyllum emarginatum
 †Sphenophyllum longifolium – or unidentified comparable form
  †Sphenopteris
 †Sphenopteris distans
 †Sphenopteris preslesensis
 †Sphenosphaera
 †Sphenosphaera consimilis – type locality for species
 †Spilaptera
 †Spilaptera americana – type locality for species
 †Spilomastax – type locality for genus
 †Spilomastax oligoneurus – type locality for species
 †Spinatrypa
 †Spinatrypa bellula
 †Spinatrypa occidentalis
 †Spinosporites
 †Spinosporites exiguus
 †Spinyplatyceras
 †Spinyplatyceras fornicatum
 †Spondylerpeton – type locality for genus
 †Spondylerpeton spinatum – type locality for species
 †Srokalarva – type locality for genus
  †Srokalarva berthei – type locality for species
 †Staurocephalus
 †Staurocephalus obsoleta
 †Stearoceras
 †Stearoceras involutum – type locality for species
 †Stegerhynchus
 †Stegerhynchus antiqua
 †Stegerhynchus concinna
 †Stegocoelia
 †Stegocoelia okawensis
 †Stellarocrinus
 †Stellarocrinus bilineatus – type locality for species
 †Stellarocrinus virgilensis – or unidentified comparable form
 †Stellatheca
 †Stellatheca latiloba
 †Stellatheca ornata
 †Stenopareia
 †Stenopecrinus
 †Stenopecrinus planus – or unidentified comparable form
 †Stenoscisma
 †Stenoscisma explanatum
 †Stephanopsis – type locality for genus
 †Stephanopsis mirandus – type locality for species
 †Stephanozyga
    †Stethacanthus
 †Stethacanthus altonensis
 †Stictopora
    †Stigmaria
 †Stigmaria ficoides
 †Stigmaria stellata
 †Stigmaria wedingtonensis
 †Straparollus
 †Straparollus subquadratus
 †Streblochondria
 †Striispirifer
 †Strobeus
 †Strobeus brevis
 †Strobeus paludinaeformis
  †Strophomena
 †Strophostylus
 †Strophostylus wortheni – type locality for species
 †Styptobasis
 †Styptobasis aculeata – type locality for species
 †Subglobosochonetes
 †Subglobosochonetes jerseyensis
   †Symmorium – type locality for genus
 †Symmorium reniforme – type locality for species
 †Syntonoptera – type locality for genus
 †Syntonoptera schucherti – type locality for species
 †Sypharoptera – type locality for genus
 †Sypharoptera pneuma – type locality for species
  †Syringopora
 †Syringothyris
 †Syringothyris extenuata
 †Syringothyris hannibalensis

T

 †Tainoceras
 †Tainoceras monilifer
 †Tainoceras sexlineatum – type locality for species
 †Telangiopsis
 †Telangium
 †Telmatoscorpio – type locality for genus
 †Telmatoscorpio brevipectus – type locality for species
   †Tentaculites
 †Tentaculites bellulus
 †Terpnocrinus – type locality for genus
 †Terpnocrinus ocoyaensis – type locality for species
 †Testajapyx – type locality for genus
 †Testajapyx thomasi – type locality for species
 †Thalamocrinus
 †Thaleops
 †Thaleops depressicapitata
 †Thallites
 †Thallites dichopleurus
 †Thebanaspis
 †Thebanaspis channahonensis
 †Thebesia
 †Thebesia thebesensis
 †Thelyphrynus – type locality for genus
 †Thelyphrynus elongatus – type locality for species
 †Thesoneura – type locality for genus
 †Thesoneura americana – type locality for species
 †Thigriffides
 †Thigriffides roundyi
 †Tholocrinus
 †Tholocrinus discus – type locality for species
 †Tholocrinus unionensis – type locality for species
 †Thuroholia
 †Thuroholia cribriformis – type locality for species
 †Thuroholia croneisi – type locality for species
 †Thyloblatta
 †Thymospora
 †Thymospora pseudothiessenii
 †Titanoscorpio – type locality for genus
 †Titanoscorpio douglassi – type locality for species
 †Torispora
 †Torispora securis
 †Torynifer
 †Torynifer setiger
 †Tranodis
 †Tranodis castrensis
 †Tremanotus
 †Trepospira
 †Trepospira depressa
 †Triamara
 †Triamara tumida
 †Triamara ventricosa
 †Trigera – tentative report
 †Trigonocarpus
 †Trigonoglossa – tentative report
 †Trigonoglossa nebrascensis
 †Trigonotarbus
 †Trigonotarbus carbonarius – type locality for species
 †Trihyphaecites
 †Trihyphaecites triangulatus
 †Triquitrites
 †Triquitrites additus
 †Triquitrites arculatus – or unidentified comparable form
 †Triquitrites bransonii
 †Triquitrites crassus
 †Triquitrites desperatus
 †Triquitrites dividuus
 †Triquitrites exiguus
 †Triquitrites minutus
 †Triquitrites protensus
 †Triquitrites pulvinatus
 †Triquitrites sculptilis
 †Triquitrites spinosus
 †Triquitrites subspinosus
 †Triquitrites trigonappendix
 †Triquitrites truncatus
 †Triticites
 †Triticites pauper
 †Triticites turgidus
 †Trochonema
 †Trochonema umbilicata – or unidentified comparable form
 †Trochurus
 †Trochurus welleri
 †Tropidodiscus
 †Tropidodiscus compticarinatus
 †Tuberculatosporites
 †Tuberculatosporites robustus
    †Tullimonstrum – type locality for genus
 †Tullimonstrum gregarius – type locality for species
 †Turnbullia – type locality for genus
 †Turnbullia priscillae – type locality for species
 †Tylothyris
 †Tylothyris missouriensis

U

 †Ulocrinus
 †Ulocrinus convexus
 †Ulocrinus sangamonensis
 †Undulabucania
 †Undulabucania punctifrons
 †Unispirifer
 †Unispirifer senex

V

 †Vallatisporites
 †Valmeyeraphycus
 †Valmeyeraphycus jerseyensis
 †Valmeyerodendron
 †Valmeyerodendron triangularifolium
 †Verrucosisporites
 †Verrucosisporites compactus
 †Verrucosisporites donarii
 †Verrucosisporites firmus
 †Verrucosisporites microtuberosus
 †Verrucosisporites papulosus
 †Verrucosisporites sifati
 †Verrucosisporites verrucosus
 †Verrucosisporites verus – or unidentified comparable form
 †Vesicaspora
 †Vesicaspora wilsonii
 †Vestispora
 †Vestispora colchesterensis
 †Vestispora costata
 †Vestispora fenestrata
 †Vestispora foveata
 †Vestispora irregularis
 †Vestispora laevigata
 †Vestispora profunda
 †Vestispora pseudoreticulata
 †Vestispora wanlessii
 †Volsellina
 †Volsellina subelliptica

W

 †Waeringoscorpio – type locality for genus
 †Waeringoscorpio alliedensis – type locality for species
 †Wellerella
 †Wellerella osagensis
 †Wellerella tetrahedra
 †Welleriella – tentative report
 †Whidbornella
 †Whidbornella curtirostris
 †Whitella
 †Whitella sterlingensis
 †Whitfieldella
 †Whitfieldella billingsana
 †Whittleseya
 †Wilkingia
 †Wilkingia costatum
 †Wilsonites
 †Wilsonites circularis
 †Wilsonites delicatus
 †Wilsonites vesicatus
 †Worthenia
 †Worthenia tabulata

X

  †Xyloiulus
 †Xyloiulus frustulentus – type locality for species
 †Xyloiulus mazonus – type locality for species

Y

 †Yochelsonospira – type locality for genus
 †Yochelsonospira tenuilineata – type locality for species
 Yoldia

Z

 †Zangerlispongia – type locality for genus
 †Zangerlispongia richardsoni – type locality for species
 †Zaphrenthis
 †Zaphrenthis stokesi
 †Zeilleria
 †Zeugopleura
 †Zeugopleura jeffersonensis
 †Zophocrinus – tentative report
 †Zosterogrammus – type locality for genus
 †Zosterogrammus stichostethus – type locality for species

References
 

Paleozoic
Life
Illinois